Murray Boroughs was an electoral district of the Legislative Assembly in the Australian state of Victoria from 1856 to 1877. It was based in northern Victoria, and included the towns of Benalla 
Avenel Euroa Seymour, 
Wodonga and Wangaratta.
The district of Murray Boroughs was one of the initial districts of the first Victorian Legislative Assembly, 1856.

Members
One member was elected to the electorate.

      # = by-election

References

Former electoral districts of Victoria (Australia)
1856 establishments in Australia
1877 disestablishments in Australia